Marasmarcha lunaedactyla, also known as the crescent plume is a moth of the family Pterophoridae found in most of Europe. It was first described by Adrian Hardy Haworth in 1811.

Description
The wingspan is 18–22 mm. Adults have a moon-shaped creamy-white marking at the cleft of their brownish forewing, hence the names crescent plume and M. lunaedactyla. Adults are on wing from June to August.

The larvae feed on the flowers and young shoots of Ononis species, including common restharrow (Ononis repens), spiny restharrow (Ononis spinosa), yellow restharrow (Ononis natrix), round-leaved restharrow (Ononis rotundifolia) and Ononis arvensis. Pupation takes place along a shoot or on a leaf of the food plant.

Distribution
The crescent plume is found in most of Europe, except Ireland and most of the Balkan Peninsula.

References

External links
microlepidoptera.nl

Exelastini
Moths described in 1811
Plume moths of Europe
Taxa named by Adrian Hardy Haworth